Moffat Hospital is a small community hospital at Moffat in Dumfries and Galloway, Scotland. It is managed by NHS Dumfries and Galloway.

History
The hospital, which was designed by Edward Maidman, opened in October 1906. A maternity wing, designed by Evan Tweedie, was added in 1928 and extensive alterations were completed in 1984.

Services
The hospital, which provides consultant-led services for frail elderly patients, has 12 long stay beds for inpatient care and a day hospital for assessment and rehabilitation.

References 

NHS Dumfries and Galloway
NHS Scotland hospitals
1906 establishments in Scotland
Hospitals in Dumfries and Galloway
Moffat